In enzymology, a 5-hydroxypentanoate CoA-transferase is an enzyme that catalyzes the chemical reaction

acetyl-CoA + 5-hydroxypentanoate  acetate + 5-hydroxypentanoyl-CoA

Thus, the two substrates of this enzyme are acetyl-CoA and 5-hydroxypentanoate, whereas its two products are acetate and 5-hydroxypentanoyl-CoA.

This enzyme belongs to the family of transferases, specifically the CoA-transferases.  The systematic name of this enzyme class is acetyl-CoA:5-hydroxypentanoate CoA-transferase. Other names in common use include 5-hydroxyvalerate CoA-transferase, and 5-hydroxyvalerate coenzyme A transferase.

References

 

EC 2.8.3
Enzymes of unknown structure